The Embarrassment was an American quartet formed in 1979 in Wichita, Kansas, that was active from 1979 to 1983, but has reunited several times since then. The band consisted of guitarist Bill Goffrier, lead singer and organist John Nichols, bassist Ron Klaus and drummer Brent Giessmann. After the break-up, Giessmann played for The Del Fuegos and Goffrier formed Big Dipper. The band was considered a prominent part of the Lawrence music scene of the early 1980s.

History
Although some people considered the band punk rock, the band itself liked to describe themselves as "Blister Pop."  The Village Voice's long-time chief music critic, Robert Christgau, called them a "great lost American band."  Along with bands like Get Smart!, and the Mortal Micronotz, the Embarrassment were prominent in the Lawrence punk scene of the early '80s and they would regularly play at venues like the Lawrence Opera House (now called "Liberty Hall") and the Off The Wall Hall (later called "Cogburn's", now called "The Bottleneck").

The Embarrassment stopped performing when two of the members moved to Boston. Giessmann drummed for The Del Fuegos, and Goffrier formed the band Big Dipper with former members of the Volcano Suns. Several of The Embarrassment's unreleased songs were recorded by Big Dipper, including "Faith Healer," which was later covered by Japanese all-girl group Shonen Knife.

The "Embos," as fans call them, have played several reunion concerts in the years since, the latest being in  August 2008, when they played an acoustic show in Wichita.

Kansas-born political writer Thomas Frank quoted lyrics from their song "Sex Drive" in his bestselling 2004 book What's the Matter with Kansas?.

Reunions

1980s
The Embarrassment played a reunion show on New Year's Eve in 1985 at Cogburn's (now "The Bottleneck") in Lawrence. Original drummer Brent Geissmann was unable to participate, as he was on tour with the Del Fuegos.
They played the following New Year's Eve at Cogburn's, with all four original members participating. Also on the bill was another Kansas band, the Micronotz. In 1988/1989 they converged again for three reunion shows: one on New Year's at Big Dog Studio in Wichita and the next two at The Bottleneck in Lawrence (formerly "Cogburn's") on January 5 and 6. The Moving Van Goghs opened the show on January 5, and the Sin City Disciples opened the show on January 6.

2000s
The Embarrassment played a few reunion shows 2006, first at The Roadhouse, in Wichita, with Local Band on 18 August and The Sluggos on 19 August. On August 20, the band performed at Liberty Hall (formerly the "Lawrence Opera House"), with special guests Kill Creek and The Mortal Micronotz.
The Embarrassment performed an acoustic concert August 30, 2008 at John Barleycorn's in Wichita. The performance was opened by Brent Giessmann solo on electric piano for a few songs, then the local group The Sluggos. The original trio of Goffrier, Nichols, and Giessmann then took the stage with Eric Cale (cover artist for the 1983 Death Travels West album) on upright bass and Freedy Johnston on additional guitar and backing vocals. Some new, or previously unperformed work was presented, including the song "Carpshoot", written by Ron Klaus, who was not able to attend. Freedy Johnston followed to end the night with his solo work.

Discography

Singles & EPs
1980 - "Sex Drive"/"Patio Set" (Big Time - 7") 
1981 - The Embarrassment 5-song EP (Cynykyl Records - 12" 45 rpm) 
1981 - Fresh Sounds From Middle America (vol 1) 5-songs (Fresh Sounds - cassette)
1989 - "Beautiful Day" (Bar/None promo CD single, from God Help Us" album)

Albums
1983 - Death Travels West (Fresh Sounds - mini LP)
1984 - The Embarrassment Retrospective (Fresh Sounds - cassette)
1990 - God Help Us LP and CD (Bar/None) 
2001 - Blister Pop CD (My Pal God) 

Compilation albums
1987 - The Embarrassment LP (Time To Develop) 
1995 - Heyday 1979-83 Double CD (Bar/None) 

Compilation appearances
1981 - Battle of the Garages Volume 1 (Bomp! Records)
1981 - Sub Pop 5 (Sub Pop - cassette)
1982 - Sub Pop 7 (Sub Pop - cassette)
1988 - Human Music (Homestead)
1989 - Time for a Change'' (Bar/None)

Reception
"In the early 1980s, Wichita, Kansas's Embarrassment secretly set a template for American indie-rock: edgy, rocking tunes full of clever wordplay and subtle wit, as played by four guys in thick glasses. They fell somewhere between the Feelies' perpetual nervousness and the Replacements' inebriated garage-rock; it's hard to think of many other peers from their era." (Mike Appelstein, Amazon) 
"From exotic Wichita, with a gift for hookily hypnotic guitar lines that need a haircut... Now that I've finally gotten the message, a year and a half after this great lost American band dispersed into the wilds of Wichita, I still can't repeat it back to you." (Robert Christgau, critic for the Village Voice) 
"Before they broke up in 1983, this quartet from Wichita, Kansas rocked furiously, with less brittle/more melodious guitar than the Scottish new wave pop bands Orange Juice and Josef K to whom the Embos were sometimes compared." (Jim Green/Ira Robbins/Jack Partain, Trouser Press) 
"The group's eclectic yet distinctive sound wrapped a post-punk approach and a deadpan sense of humor around pop, country, disco, and metal elements, crafting songs that rivaled the work of better-known contemporaries like Gang of Four, Mission of Burma, and the Feelies." (Heather Phares, Allmusic) 
"They played tight, blistering pop songs when overproduced stadium-rock anthems and repetitive disco tracks were the norm... The Embarrassment continues to foster a national reputation as 'The best band you never heard of.' " (Jon Niccum, Lawrence Journal-World)

References

External links
 
 Over 20 videos of The Embarrassment at archive.org
 
 
 Trouser Press entry
 The old official The Embarrassment website (archived on their current website)
 Bar/None Records page on the Embarrassment
 Brief article on The Embarrassment, with discography
 embos: The Embarrassment Appreciation Society (Yahoo! Groups)

American punk rock groups
Rock music groups from Kansas
My Pal God Records artists
Fresh Sounds Records artists